TuneCore is a Brooklyn, New York–based independent digital music distribution, publishing and licensing service founded in 2005. TuneCore principally offers musicians and other rights-holders the opportunity to distribute and sell or stream their music through online retailers such as iTunes, Deezer, Spotify, Amazon Music, Google Play, Tidal, and others. TuneCore also offers music publishing administration services, helping songwriters register their compositions and collect royalties internationally.

The company currently operates out of its Brooklyn headquarters with offices in Austin, Burbank, Boston, Nashville, Atlanta, Australia, Germany, France and the United Kingdom.

History and background
TuneCore garnered media attention from ABC's World News Tonight, The Daily Mirror, and pitchforkmedia.com. TuneCore's first customer was Frank Black, lead singer of the Pixies. In 2008, TuneCore was utilized by Nine Inch Nails to deliver the music from their album, Ghosts I–IV to the Amazon MP3 store.
In December 2006, music instrument and equipment retailer Guitar Center bought a stake in TuneCore, giving the company access to the music retailer's customers. In the United States, TuneCore represents about 10 percent of the 20 million songs on iTunes, and it accounts for almost 4 percent of all digital sales. TuneCore reportedly fired Jeff Price, a co-founder and then-CEO, after the company faced a "cash-flow" crisis in 2012. Price has sued TuneCore for severance compensation and has alleged that the company may have been insolvent, an accusation that the company appears to dispute. Tunecore reported that their artists have earned a total of $83 million in Q1 of 2019, a 21 percent increase from Q1 2018. Last year, distribution income for artists reached $308 million, a 28 percent year-on-year increase.

Joe Cuello, formerly an executive at MTV was TuneCore's Chief Creative Officer from 2014 through at least 2016.

Chris Mooney, who worked with Jeff Price at spinART Records, joined Tunecore in 2008 to establish the Artist Relations team. In 2018, he left to join Ditto Music as their Head of US Artist and Label Services.

Acquisition by Believe Digital
Tunecore was acquired by Denis Ladegaillerie's Believe Digital in April 2015. The acquisition opened up artists' access to Believe Digital's wider distribution network and label services. Both of the companies remained operationally separate, while jointly claiming to represent of 25 to 30 percent of the new music uploaded to iTunes each day. After the acquisition, TuneCore and Believe used their newly increased leverage in negotiations with digital services including Spotify and Tidal to improve their services for their artists. Also in 2015, TuneCore expanded its presence in the UK and Australia announcing dedicated websites including localized currency and content for each region. It also introduced its YouTube Sound Recording service to collect revenue for artists when their sound recordings are used anywhere on YouTube. In September 2015, Tunecore stepped up its live event offerings, throwing LA's independent music community its first ever Indie Artist Forum, which focused on educating and fostering collaboration amongst aspiring professional musicians while engaging on a dialog around the ins and outs of the current landscape of the independent music business.

In the fourth quarter of 2015, TuneCore saw sustained growth, with independent artists earning over $142 million through TuneCore including $36.8 million from digital streams and downloads. During this time, TuneCore also expanded its presence in the United States, opening offices in Austin and Atlanta, and internationally, launching two new international sites in Australia and the UK featuring localized currencies and experiences. TuneCore also added Saavn, Nmusic and Zvooq—services targeting emerging markets—as partners through which artists could distribute and monetize their music. TuneCore also enjoyed notable growth in new customers in the Latin American market and the African market. TuneCore's YouTube Sound Recording Collection Service was also a key driver for increasing 2015 yearly revenue. In May 2016, TuneCore acquired artist social media management startup JustGo and re-branded it as TuneCore Social. Later in the year, it expanded its presence and launched its services in France.

Copyright fraud allegations

TuneCore has had multiple instances where their services are used to commit copyright fraud through online services like iTunes, Spotify, and Youtube. In one case, independent artists represented by TuneCore uploaded unreleased tracks by artists Playboi Carti and Lil Uzi Vert to Spotify. Plays of these tracks resulted in revenue going to the independent artists who were not the original owners of the music. In a similar case, TuneCore was sued by Round Hill Music for uploading and collecting revenue from iTunes for compositions owned by Round Hill. In a third case, TuneCore submitted copyright claims over a streamed performance of public domain classical music by Brett Yang and Eddy Chen of Twoset Violin, collecting revenue from the stream that would otherwise have gone to the performers.

References

External links
 

Internet properties established in 2005
Online music stores of the United States
Digital audio distributors